The Search for Alexander the Great is a 1981 four part TV mini-series directed by Peter Sykes, and narrated by James Mason.

Plot
Alexander the Great's family and friends reminisce at a banquet, looking back over his life, loves and conquests.

Cast
James Mason as Narrator
Jane Lapotaire as Olympias
Robert Stephens as Darius of Persia 
Julian Glover as Philip II
Nicholas Clay as Alexander 
Ian Charleson as Hephaistion
Michael Williams as Aristotle 
Michael Byrne as Demosthenes 
Gabriel Byrne as Ptolemy 
Barry Stanton as Cleitus 
Matthew Long as Attalus 
Jack Klaff as Bagoas 
Peter Porteous as Callisthenes
Justin Sykes as Young Alexander

References

External links
 

1980s British television miniseries
1981 British television series debuts
1981 British television series endings
Cultural depictions of Alexander the Great
English-language television shows
PBS original programming
Television series based on actual events
Television series set in ancient Greece